A silhouette is the image of a person, animal, object or scene represented as a solid shape of a single color, usually black, with its edges matching the outline of the subject.

Silhouette or Silhouettes may also refer to:

 Étienne de Silhouette (1709–1767), Controller-General of Finances under Louis XV

Arts, entertainment and media

Fictional characters
 Silhouette (comics), a Marvel Comic heroine
 Silhouette, a character in the Watchmen series
 Aunt Silhouette, a character introduced in Book Index 57, page 8 of 9, of Margaret Atwood's novel The Testaments (2019)

Music

Groups and labels
 Silhouette (band), a Dutch progressive rock band
 Silhouette, an alias used briefly in the mid-1980s by American singer Jeanie Tracy
 The Silhouettes, an American R&B/doo-wop group

Albums
 Silhouette (album), 1988, by jazz musician Kenny G
 Silhouettes (Aquilo album), 2017
 Silhouettes (Klaus Schulze album), 2018
 Silhouettes (Lonnie Liston Smith album), 1984
 Silhouettes (Textures album), 2008
 The Silhouette (album), 2007, by metal band Ava Inferi

Songs
 Silhouette (Kenny G instrumental), 1988
 "Silhouette", by Aquilo from their 2017 album Silhouettes
 "Silhouette" (Kana-Boon song), 2014
 "Silhouette", By Mike Oldfield from his 2008 album Music of the Spheres
 "Silhouette", by Opeth from their 1995 album Orchid
 "Silhouette", by Owl City from their 2012 album The Midsummer Station
 "Silhouette", by Thrice from their 2003 album The Artist in the Ambulance
 "Silhouettes" (Avicii song), 2012
 "Silhouettes" (Marmaduke Duke song), 2009
 "Silhouettes" (The Rays song), 1957, covered by Steve Gibson & the Red Caps, Herman's Hermits and others
 "Silhouettes", by Of Monsters and Men on The Hunger Games: Catching Fire – Original Motion Picture Soundtrack
 "Silhouettes", by Smile Empty Soul from their 2003 album Smile Empty Soul (album)

Other uses in arts, entertainment, and media
 Silhouette (Doctor Who), a 2014 novel
 Silhouette RPG, a generic role-playing game system 
 Silhouettes (dance group), an American dance group in the sixth season of America's Got Talent
 The Silhouette, the student newspaper of McMaster University in Hamilton, Ontario, Canada

Transport
 Silhouette (boat)
 Silhouette (show rod), a show car built by Bill Cushenbery
 Celebrity Silhouette, a cruise ship
 Lamborghini Silhouette
 Oldsmobile Silhouette

Other uses 
 Silhouette racing car
 Silhouette (clustering), a method used in cluster analysis
 Silhouette (eyewear), an Austrian brand of sunglasses and eyeglasses
 Silhouette (lingerie), an English manufacturer of women’s lingerie
 Silhouette Island, in the Seychelles
 Clipping path, for clip silhouettes.